Melbourne Airport Rail is a rail link under construction from the Melbourne CBD to Melbourne Airport at Tullamarine. Since October 2022 the project has also been branded as SRL Airport. The rail link is to run through the under-construction Metro Tunnel, running 27 km from the airport to Town Hall station in the city centre with 12 km of new track between the airport and Sunshine station. The link will be a new branch of the Melbourne Metro rail network and run High-Capacity Metro Trains at a 10-minute frequency. The project is being delivered by the Victorian state government agency Rail Projects Victoria. 

A rail link to Melbourne Airport has been proposed in multiple forms at various times in the history of the airport. Most such proposals have been for a heavy rail line between the airport Melbourne CBD, often as an integrated component of the Melbourne rail network. Some plans, however, have utilised alternative forms of mass transit or suggested a segregated and dedicated public transport link to the airport. Relieving traffic congestion and creating better access to the airport are frequently cited as reasons for the development of the link. Businesses that would be negatively impacted by an airport rail link include Transurban, whose CityLink toll revenue would be affected, and Melbourne Airport, whose revenue from car parking would be reduced.

In 2018, the Victorian government announced its intention to proceed with a link running via Sunshine station. A preliminary business case was completed later that year, and in early 2019, the federal government agreed to partially fund the project. In 2020 it was announced that the link would run through the city via the Metro Tunnel. Early construction began in 2022, with major construction expected to start in 2023 and an estimated completion in 2029.

Background 

In the 2016–17 financial year, 34.8 million passengers and 237,000 aircraft movements were recorded, making it the second-busiest airport in Australia by passenger numbers.

The airport is served by the Tullamarine Freeway, which connects to the Melbourne city centre via the CityLink tollway. An express bus service, SkyBus, connects the airport to Southern Cross railway station, a main railway terminus, with a 20–40 minute travel time and various private bus services also serve the airport precinct. A SmartBus route connects to Broadmeadows railway station with a one-hour journey time to the CBD at regular public transport fares.

History

20th century 
With the appointment of a panel to examine the aviation needs of the growing city of Melbourne in 1958, and its recommendation of a site at Tullamarine on the city's north-western outskirts in 1959, the earliest suggestions for a railway line were made by stakeholders in the new facility's success. The City Development Association proposed connecting any new airport to the public transport as early as 1958, and Trans Australia Airlines proposed tunnelling directly between the CBD and the airport when the site was announced. Reg Ansett, however, another direct beneficiary of the new airport, envisioned helicopters and freeways becoming the primary modes of transport for passengers and staff.

The first legislative attempt at a rail link to the new airport was made in 1965, while it was still under construction. Minister for Transport Edward Meagher introduced the Glenroy Tullamarine Rail Construction Bill 1965 to the state parliament, proposing the construction of a link between the Broadmeadows line at Glenroy and the new "jetport". During the bill's reading in the Lower House, Meagher estimated the new line's cost at £1.5 million, and suggested that it ought to be constructed in conjunction with a third track into the city along the existing line, works which formed part of the Victorian Railways 10-year strategic plan at the time.

The bill was focused on acquiring land and protecting the reservation for a future railway line in the interests of cost savings, and Meagher acknowledged that construction could not be justified at least until the airport had opened. However, opposing parties voted against the bill on the basis that such a railway would never be economically viable, instead suggesting a branch from the Albion–Jacana freight line in order to extend public transport option to the growing north-western suburbs. Nevertheless, the plan did reach the Upper House, where it was referred to a committee for further evaluation, but the parliamentary session lapsed before any further action was taken, and subsequent rounds of railway funding did not include any related works.

In the decades following the opening of Melbourne Airport, a number of proposals for mass transit links to the CBD emerged, many of which came from private investors and utilised emergent or unconventional technologies. One such proposal, Aerotrain, was presented by a consortium which had received the backing of the French government in the early 1970s to construct a monorail from Paris to Pontoise. The company proposed a similar system for Melbourne, and a feasibility study was conducted, which found the technology had a significant cost advantage over traditional heavy rail. The company's efforts were stymied by the French government's withdrawal of support in 1974 and the death of its leader in 1975, and no further progress eventuated.

Development of Sunshine route 
The Liberal state government led by Jeff Kennett reserved land for an extension of what was then the Broadmeadows line to the airport via Westmeadows. Then, in 2001, the Bracks government investigated the construction of a heavy rail link to the airport under the Linking Victoria programme. Two options were considered; the first branched off the Craigieburn line to the east, and the second branched off the Albion–Jacana freight line, which passes close to the airport's boundary to the south. The second option was preferred. Market research concluded most passengers preferred travelling to the airport by taxi or car, and poor patronage of similar links in Sydney and Brisbane cast doubt on the viability of the project. This led to the project being deferred until at least 2012. On 21 July 2008, the Premier Steve Bracks reaffirmed the government's commitment to a rail link and said that it would be considered within three to five years. To maximise future development options, the airport lobbied for the on-grounds section of the railway to be underground.

In 2010, Martin Pakula of the Labor Party, newly appointed Minister for Public Transport, announced that the rail link had been taken off the agenda with new freeway options being explored instead, however a change of government at the 2010 Victorian State Election to Liberals, saw policy for the introduction of the rail link return to the agenda, with a promise by the incoming Coalition government to undertake planning for its construction.

Proposals in January 2013 to improve the bus service to the airport involving turning emergency lanes into bus lanes on the freeway and the Bolte Bridge and  allowing Myki to be used on SkyBus services were challenged by CityLink operator Transurban, because it would limit its toll revenue, and by Melbourne Airport, because it would reduce its car parking profits. Similar objections would apply to a rail link.

On 13 March 2013, the Victorian Liberal government under then Premier, Denis Napthine, announced that the Melbourne Airport Rail Link would be constructed around 2015/16 running from the CBD via Sunshine station and the Albion–Jacana freight line. This proposal never became a reality, with the Napthine Government losing office to the Labor Party at the 2014 state election.

Andrews government proposal 

From the mid-2010s, following the construction of the Regional Rail Link, consensus shifted toward integrating an airport rail link into the regional rail network instead of the stand-alone metropolitan line affirmed by the NDPMR. A much-publicised 2016 report by advocacy group the Rail Futures Institute, which primarily focused on improving capacity and journey times to regional centres, recommended using a new diversion of the Bendigo and Seymour lines to serve the airport at the same time as segregating the regional lines from metropolitan services.

In 2015 and 2016, the Andrews government decided to shelve the Airport rail link proposal and instead focus on inner city rail projects such as the Melbourne Metro Rail Project. The airport line was excluded from the Metro Tunnel's eventual 2016 business case, with Public Transport Victoria (PTV) recognising the tunnel's entire capacity would be needed to serve the Sunbury and newly electrified Melton lines; planners recommended that any airport link would have to use further new capacity into the city. But after enormous pressure from the Coalition Federal Governments of Tony Abbott and Malcolm Turnbull to plan for a proposal, the Andrews Government announced in May 2017 that it would spend $10 million along with the Turnbull Government’s $30 million to devise a rail link planning study. On 23 November 2017, Premier Daniel Andrews told business groups that construction on a rail link between the Airport and Melbourne's Southern Cross station via Sunshine station would begin construction within the next 10 years.

On 12 April 2018, Prime Minister Malcolm Turnbull announced that the Federal Government would pledge $5 billion for a rail link between the airport and Melbourne's CBD. He had also stated that the Victorian State Government would also have to match Federal funding in order for the project to proceed. With a 50-50 funding split between the State and Federal governments, a possible private investment in the project could see the total cost rise to $15 billion.

On 22 July 2018, the State Government announced that it would provide $5 billion to match Federal Government funding for the Airport rail link, allowing the project to become a reality. Under the state government's plan, a business case would be completed by the end of 2019 and construction would commence by 2022. Then, in early September, the airport link featured in the state government's Suburban Rail Loop proposal, as part of an orbital line extending from Cheltenham in the city's east to Werribee in the west.

Later in September, a private consortium including the operators of Melbourne Airport and Southern Cross station, as well as Metro Trains Melbourne, the incumbent metropolitan rail franchisee, and IFM Investors, presented an unsolicited proposal to the government, offering to contribute $5 billion in private equity alongside the existing government contributions. The consortium, AirRail Melbourne, proposed using the funds to substantially rebuild Southern Cross, and provide dedicated tracks along the entire route via Sunshine.

Following the state election in November, the returned Andrews government confirmed that a preliminary business case for the project had been completed. However, it refused to release the document, instead claiming that a full business case would be completed the following year and publicly released.

Prime Minister Scott Morrison and Premier Andrews announced at a joint media conference in March 2019 that an agreement had been reached between the state and federal government to provide $5 billion in funding each towards the airport link. The agreement provided for a total cost of up to $13 billion, with the remaining funds to be sought from private sector investors, and committed the state government to completing a business case within 12 months. Andrews restated the government's intention to start construction by 2022, and said that he expected construction to take up to nine years.

Planning

Route options 
The 2013 study conducted by PTV assessed over 80 options in addition to the Albion East "base case" developed by previous planning work. Ultimately, four options were shortlisted and recommended for further analysis. The same four options were presented in 2018 by the federal government during its announcement of funds, on the understanding that a preliminary business case to be completed in September that year would recommend one of the options.

 Sunshine/Albion East: The Albion East route uses existing passenger rail alignments from the city centre to Albion via Sunshine. It then follows the Albion–Jacana line alignment, used primarily for freight traffic, before following a new reservation north-west to the airport. This route was identified as the preferred option by the 2013 PTV study, and is the preferred option of the Andrews state government, in both cases due to its connectivity to the existing network.
 Direct Tunnel: This route uses an entirely new alignment, constructed as a tunnel between the city centre and the above-ground reservation used by the Albion East route, from which point it continues to the airport. Because of its directness, this route provides the fastest travel time to the airport of the four shortlisted routes. The tunnel potentially travels via the Victoria University campus at Footscray, Highpoint Shopping Centre and the site of the former Department of Defence munitions factory at Maribyrnong. Although this option is the most expensive among the shortlisted routes, and was therefore not recommended by the PTV study, it was the preferred option of the federal government because of its potential to service a new housing estate on the Defence site.
 Flemington - via Milleara Road, Highpoint Shopping Centre, Flemington
 Craigieburn - via Attwood, Coolaroo, Broadmeadows

Preferred route 

The Victorian State government has committed to the Sunshine route, with the release of its Strategic Assessment of the route in July 2018. The Federal government under then-Prime Minister Malcolm Turnbull had pushed for the direct tunnel route through Maribyrnong, as it proposed to redevelop the unused Defence site along the Maribyrnong River into a new residential area and connect the airport to the nearby Highpoint Shopping Centre. In 2019, under the new Prime Minister Scott Morrison, both the federal and state governments backed the Sunshine route as part of their funding commitments to the project.

Government planning explored a number of questions about the route: including how it will interact with the under construction Metro Tunnel, the planned Suburban Rail Loop, and potential faster rail to Geelong, Ballarat and Bendigo. The State Government had indicated that new Sunshine to CBD rail capacity, built as part of the Airport Rail Link, could be used by new, faster train services to Geelong and Ballarat. This would be delivered alongside new, electrified Metro lines to Melton and Wyndham Vale as part of the Government's Western Rail Plan. Planning for regional fast rail will take place alongside the business case development for the Airport Rail Link. This proposal would have built upon a plan by the Rail Futures Institute to use the Airport Rail Link to deliver faster regional rail. In 2019 the Government indicated it did not want to build a dedicated tunnel between the CBD and Sunshine for Airport and regional trains due to cost.

Metro Tunnel branch 
In late 2020 the State and Federal Governments announced that the Airport Rail Link would be built as a branch of the metropolitan lines that are to run through the Metro Tunnel, with trains not running to Southern Cross Station but instead running into the CBD through the five new underground Metro Tunnel stations, then on towards Pakenham and Cranbourne. New twin track is to be built from Sunshine to the airport, with modified High-Capacity Metro Trains to share track with Sunbury trains towards the city. Trains are to run every 10 minutes, taking 29 minutes to run from Town Hall station in the city centre to the Airport. More than 30 stations will have a one-seat journey to the airport under the plan. The government also rejected a private-sector offer to build a 7 km express tunnel from Southern Cross to West Footscray. Instead construction is set to start in 2022 with the full line opening in 2029. The government also announced it was considering adding an additional station along the new line between Sunshine and the airport, near Airport West and Keilor Park.

In September 2022, the State Government released the project's business case, which found the project would return an economic benefit of $2.10 for every dollar spent. The Transport Infrastructure Minister Jacinta Allan also announced that the airport station would be elevated, rather than underground, and that a new station would be added at Keilor Park in Melbourne's north-west. The elevated design, Allan said, would be quicker to build, cheaper and cause less disruption. Melbourne Airport objected to the proposal, calling for the station to be underground in order to facilitate its plans for terminal expansion.

Project description 

The airport link will be a branch of Melbourne's existing metropolitan rail network, running express from Sunshine to the airport. 12 km of new double track will be built from Sunshine station to a new premium station at Melbourne Airport. A new rail bridge will be built above the Maribynong River next to the existing heritage Albion Viaduct. The new bridge will be 55 metres high and 383 metres long and become the second-highest bridge in Victoria after the West Gate Bridge.

Sunshine station will be expanded as part of the plan, becoming a new hub for transfers from suburban and regional services to the airport line. A new concourse will be built, along with new platforms, platform extensions and accessibility upgrades. A large 18 metre high flyover will be built above Albion station and Ballarat Road. There will be a 6 km long section of elevated rail over the Western Ring Road and Airport Drive. The airport station will be an elevated terminal station, connected by walkway to the airport's main terminals. The design will accommodate a future Suburban Rail Loop connection.

A second new station is to be built along the line at the border of Airport West and Keilor Park to serve Melbourne's north-west.

At the city end, the airport line will run through the new underground Metro Tunnel stations at State Library and Town Hall, which will allow interchange to all other suburban services via the existing major stations Melbourne Central and Flinders Street, respectively. High Capacity Metro Trains, 7-car trains introduced as part of the Metro Tunnel project, will run to the airport, and high-capacity signalling will be installed along the new airport line.

Airport trains will run every ten minutes all-day, taking approximately 30 minutes to reach the CBD from the airport. Ticketing will be through the metropolitan rail network's Myki smart-card system and be priced similar to existing Skybus fares.

Construction 

The airport link is to be delivered across a number of construction packages. In June 2021, the first package was put out to tender for works around Sunshine and Albion stations. In November 2021 two works packages were put out for the premium station at Melbourne Airport and a 6 km long section of elevated rail over the Western Ring Road and above Airport Drive. In March 2022, a contract was awarded to Laing O'Rourke as managing contractor to deliver early works on the project, including the relocation and protection of utilities along the route, with works to begin in late 2022.

In late October 2022, construction starting on the rail link with works to relocate six electricity transmission towers. The Premier announced a consortium of FCC Construction Australia, Winslow Infrastructure and McConnell Dowell had been awarded a major works contract, including the new 550m bridge over the Maribyrnong River. A consortium of John Holland, CPB, KBR and AECOM were selected to deliver the Sunshine station systems works, including building new elevated tracks and rebuilding Sunshine and Albion stations. The Premier also announced $143 million in extra funding for developing Sunshine station and its surroundings, including a new bus interchange and new open space as part of the Sunshine station masterplan. The project was also rebranded as SRL Airport to emphasise its role in the Suburban Rail Loop corridor.

In December 2022, a consortium of FCC Construction Australia and Winslow Infrastructure was selected to deliver the package of construction works including the 550m bridge over the Maribynong River. A second contract of works, the Sunshine Systems Alliance package, was awarded to a consortium of John Holland, CPB, KBR and AECOM, and included train signalling across the entire Airport rail corridor, works to Sunshine station, works to Albion station, and twin tracks between Sunshine station and the Albion-Jacana corridor, including the new Albion rail flyover. The Corridor Package, which includes the new Keilor East station and new track over the Western Ring Road, was set to be awarded in 2023.

See also 
 Melbourne Airport
 Avalon Airport railway line
 Suburban Rail Loop
 Proposed Melbourne rail extensions

References

Bibliography

External links
Melbourne Airport Rail website
Public Transport Victoria - Melbourne Airport Rail Link Study

Proposed railway lines in Australia
Railway lines in Melbourne
Rail transport in Melbourne
Public transport in Melbourne
Airport rail links in Australia
2029 in rail transport
Rail link